Puerto Rico Highway 37 (PR-37) is an urban road between San Juan (in Santurce area) and Carolina (in Isla Verde area). In Santurce is known as Calle Loíza and the Isla Verde area is known as Avenida Isla Verde.

Route description
It is the main road in Isla Verde. The hotel zone of Isla Verde is located on this road and is located near Luis Muñoz Marín International Airport. Also, on this road lies the Luis Llorens Torres public housing.

Among their intersections are the PR-187, to Piñones (tourist area of Loíza), PR-26 (Expreso Baldorioty de Castro), PR-25 (Avenida Juan Ponce de León) and PR-35 (Avenida Manuel Fernández Juncos). Near PR-37 is PR-22 (Autopista José de Diego), which can be accessed from this road.

Major intersections

See also

 List of highways numbered 37

References

External links
 

037